Les Figons is a hamlet west of Aix-en-Provence in France. It is part of the commune of Éguilles. In 1820, there were 172 inhabitants.

References

Villages in Provence-Alpes-Côte d'Azur